The 2012 season was the Hawthorn Football Club's 88th season in the Australian Football League and 111th overall.

The season would prove to be Hawthorn's most dominant season in the 2012-2015 run of consecutive successful years, only to be denied the ultimate success in the 2012 AFL Grand Final due to inaccurate kicking.

Playing list changes 
The following lists all player changes between the conclusion of the 2011 season and the beginning of the 2012 season.

Trades

Draft

AFL draft

Rookie draft

Retirements and delistings

2012 player squad

Fixture

NAB Cup

Premiership season

Ladder

Finals series

References

External links
 Official website of the Hawthorn Football Club
 Official website of the Australian Football League 

Hawthorn Football Club Season, 2012
Hawthorn Football Club seasons